Concluded on 9 October 1709, the Treaty of Thorn was an agreement signed in Thorn (Toruń) between Augustus the Strong of the Polish-Lithuanian Commonwealth and his counterpart, Peter the Great the Tsar of Russia. Through this agreement, the two parties revived an alliance from an earlier treaty between them in 1699, which their common rival Charles XII of Sweden had dismantled through the 1706 Treaty of Altranstädt. In the 1709 treaty, the two parties agreed to restore the Polish crown to Augustus among various other provisions with different implications for both parties and their respective nations. A close examination of the background to the agreement as well as the terms, implementation, and implications of the Treaty of Thorn underscores its significance in marking the Tsar’s and Russia’s ascendance into a powerful regional player in northeastern Europe.

Background
During the Great Northern War, a resounding Russian victory had brought down Charles XII and his Polish and Ukrainian allies at Poltava in June 1709. Russian Tsar Peter the Great had earned a decisive defeat of the Swedish at the Battle of Poltava, in the process giving him the upper hand in the course of the conflict. The destruction of the main Swedish army and resultant exile of King Charles XII of Sweden to the Ottoman Empire paved the way for the return of Augustus the Strong, earlier dethroned as Polish king by Charles XII in the Altranstädt Treaty in 1706. Augustus then successfully marched into the Polish–Lithuanian Commonwealth and reclaimed the Polish crown from Stanisław Leszczyński, ally to Charles XII. The territory that Augustus had re-conquered in 1709 encompassed the Polish city of Thorn, where Augustus would then meet with the Tsar Peter the Great to consider and implement terms for a common policy in relation to governance in northeastern Europe. Notably, the Battle of Poltava virtually became the turning point of the war in every respect, not only deciding the outcome of the war but also the course of the reigns of the monarchs involved and the fates of their nations.

Terms of the Treaty 

In the Treaty, the Tsar promised to restore Augustus the Strong to the Polish throne while Augustus was in turn expected to launch a struggle against Russia’s adversaries in Poland. In addition to these terms, the agreement also included a secret article in which Augustus would receive Livland whereas Russia might retain the province of Estonia beyond previously conquered territories. From the time of the 1709 treaty, Peter’s influence in Polish internal affairs increased, such that signs of a permanent Russian protectorate in Poland had become evident by the middle of the eighteenth century. In another secret clause in the 1709 treaty at Thorn, Peter also agreed to support Augustus's aim to have his son royally elected king vivente rege. In line with the agreement and ensuing alliance, Peter supported Augustus' restoration as Polish king, after he had made sure that the highest offices in the Polish–Lithuanian Commonwealth were occupied by nobles supportive of himself. Meanwhile, Augustus was obliged to persecute anti-Russian groups in Poland. After the conclusion of the treaty, Peter the Great resumed the re-creation of a wide anti-Swedish alliance. He traveled to nearby Marienwerder to meet with Frederick I of Prussia, before he departed to the Russian camp near Riga, where he arrived on 10 November. The Dano-Russian alliance which Charles XII had destroyed in Travendal (1700) was revived in the subsequent Treaty of Copenhagen by Peter's diplomats at the Danish court.

Implementation of the Treaty 
A close examination of the implementation of the Treaty of Thorn demonstrates skewed gains for Russia in spite of the initial arguably balanced agreement. In line with the agreement and the ensuing alliance, Peter fulfilled his promise and supported the restoration of Augustus as Polish king. However, this was only after Peter had filled the highest offices in the Polish–Lithuanian Commonwealth with nobles that the Tsar ensured were loyal and supportive to him, in the process advancing Russia’s interests. Meanwhile, after the treaty’s conclusion, Peter the Great resumed his mission of re-creating a broad anti-Swedish alliance, traveling to Marienwerder for a meeting with Frederick I of Prussia. Elsewhere, Peter’s diplomats at the Danish court signed the Treaty of Copenhagen, restoring the Dano-Russian alliance that Charles XII had destroyed in Travendal a decade earlier.

On the other hand, Augustus was obliged to pursue and persecute Russia’s enemies in Poland. In early 1710, Augustus would enter Warsaw, the Polish capital, and force out Stanisław Leszczyński into exile in Stralsund, Swedish Pomerania. After further consolidating his position in the Poland-Lithuania realm, Augustus participated in the first combined campaign alongside Danish and Russian forces in the Great Northern War, invading Pomerania and laying siege to Stralsund in 1711. Meanwhile, Peter the Great concluded his efforts in Swedish Livonia. From such observations, the Tsar had used the treaty to gain and cement the upper hand in terms of control over regional affairs. Although Augustus had also made some gains from the Treaty’s implementation, scrutiny reveals that advantage skewed towards the Tsar in aspects such as control of the Polish–Lithuanian Commonwealth and establishment of a broad anti-Swedish alliance that would help Russia ascend at the expense of the Swedish Empire.

Implication of the Treaty of Thorn 
In contrast to the first agreement between Augustus and Peter in 1699, the conditions of the Treat of Thorn were largely dictated by and in favor of Peter the Great in spite of the concessions the Tsar had considered to Augustus. Notably, Peter’s once friendly relations with Augustus had cooled down, which meant that the Thorn meeting was not one of forcefully separated old friends. Instead, the Tsar approached the treaty guided by political priorities that would strengthen Russia’s position in the region. For instance, based on the secret articles accompanying the Treaty, Augustus had effectively ceded Estonia to Russia in contradiction to the earlier Preobrazhenskoe treaty in 1699. As a result, whereas the terms of the Treaty of Thorn appeared considerably balanced and fair, Peter was demonstrably using the agreement for political expediency.

Moreover, the Tsar also had no intentions of honoring the conditions of the Thorn treaty, which further underscores the implications of the agreement in the context of the Tsar’s political expediency and Russia’s ascendancy. For instance, Peter would violate the terms of the treaty several months later through seizing Riga after its surrender in July 1710. Although Peter the great had promised Livonia as a conquered territory to Augustus, this provision also failed to materialize. In this case, both the earlier 1699 and 1709 treaties with Augustus had seen Peter cede Livonia. However, upon Livonia’s surrender, Boris Sheremetev took it in the Tsar's name over any objections from Augustus’s side, ordering its people to swear loyalty to Peter as their new sovereign. The actions in taking Livonia in contradiction to the terms of the treaty of Thorn are especially notable in terms of demonstrating the Tsar’s actions at the expense of another power. In this case, Augustus had long nursed far-reaching plans, secret from Russia, seeking to acquire territories on behalf of the Polish-Lithuanian Commonwealth in the form of fiefdoms. Based on such interests on the part of Augustus, the Tsar’s actions in reneging on the terms of the treaty of Thorn underscore’s Russia’s ascendancy in regional power and politics.

At the same time, the control and leeway Russia gained in Poland following the agreement also underscores the view that the treaty of Thorn marked the former’s ascendancy at the expense of the latter. From the time of the 1709 treaty, Peter’s influence in Polish internal affairs increased, such that signs of a permanent Russian protectorate in Poland had become evident by the middle of the eighteenth century. On one hand, the treaty had ushered in an end to the Swedish dominance of the Polish–Lithuanian Commonwealth. However, it had actually translated to a mere replacement of one power for another, as the Tsar ended up effectively occupying the space left behind by the Swedish Empire under Charles XII. Based on such observations, Evans and Wilson contend that the restoration of power cost Augustus dearly in terms of the price of an alliance with Russia in the 1709 peace treaty of Thorn.

Notably, Russia’s presence in the Commonwealth after the defeat of Swedish control mirrors regional developments. In this case, the Treaty of Thorn captures how Russia had managed to build a broad alliance to uproot the Swedish Empire in the region in both military and political dimensions. In the process, Russia had created room for her rise and ensuing political dominance in northeastern Europe. Moreover, the Tsar’s moves and gains meant that Russia had fostered her position in terms of both defeating enemies such as the Swedish Empire, but also dominating allies such as the Polish-Lithuanian Commonwealth under Augustus. Ultimately, the treaty saw Augustus return to the Polish throne, but henceforth as a dependent of Peter the Great.

Conclusion
The Treaty of Thorn in 1709 was not only a result of a key turning point in the Great Northern War, but also a watershed moment for regional power and politics. The treaty came after the Battle of Poltava, where the Russian’s had dealt a decisive defeat to their Swedish rivals. After a meeting between Peter the Great and Augustus the Strong in 1709, the two parties agreed to the latter’s restoration to the Polish-Lithuanian throne and his support in defeating Russia’s enemies in Poland, alongside additional secret clauses pertaining to territorial gains after defeating their common foe, Charles XII. Although the Tsar dictated the terms, they appeared balanced and fair on the surface in light of the concessions made to Augustus. However, implementation heavily skewed in favor of Russia, as reflected in the Tsar’s significant gains at the expense of Augustus and his interests. Russia would benefit in terms of control in internal Polish affairs, gaining new territories in contradiction to the terms of the treaty, and a broad military and political alliance with which to fight regional enemies. As a result, the treaty had instead culminated in fostering Russia’s rise, paralleling regional developments in which Russia was gaining at the expense of both allies and foes. Ultimately, the treaty in terms of its background, terms, implementation, and outcomes provide a snapshot into Russia’s ascendancy in northeastern Europe in the early eighteenth century.

Sources

References

Bibliography
Bushkovitch, Paul (2004). Peter the Great: The struggle for power, 1671–1725. Cambridge University Press LeDonne, John (2009). 
Poltava and the geopolitics of Western Eurasia. Harvard Ukrainian Studies  Anisimov, Evgeniĭ Viktorovich (1993). 
The reforms of Peter the Great. Progress through coercion in Russia. The New Russian history. M.E. Sharpe  Frost, Robert I (2009).
"Everyone understood what it meant": The impact of the Battle of Poltava on the Polish-Lithuanian Commonwealth.
Harvard Ukrainian Studies, 31.1/4, pp. 159-176  Evans, RJW, and Peter H. Wilson. The Holy Roman Empire, 1495-1806: A European Perspective. Brill, 2012.

External links

Scan of the treaty at IEG (Institut für Europäische Geschichte) Mainz

Thorn
1709 treaties
1709 in Europe
1709 in Russia
Treaties of the Tsardom of Russia
Treaties of the Electorate of Saxony
History of Toruń
1709 in the Polish–Lithuanian Commonwealth
Bilateral treaties of Russia
Peter the Great